Waikouaiti was a parliamentary electorate in the Otago region of New Zealand, from 1866 to 1908.

Population centres
The electorate is named after the township of Waikouaiti, which is close to the Waikouaiti River.

History
William Murison was elected as the first representative, narrowly beating later Premier Julius Vogel; Vogel stood some weeks later in the Gold Fields electorate and was successful there. Murison resigned in 1868. The resulting  was won by Robert Mitchell, who in turn resigned before the end of the term in the following year.

Monro had been a member of all previous Parliaments.

Thomas Mackenzie was elected in the Waikouaiti electorate in 1902 and would represent it until the electorate's abolition in 1908, when he was elected for Taieri. Mackenzie would later become Prime Minister.

Members of Parliament
Waikouaiti was represented by ten Members of Parliament:

Key

Election results

1899 election

1875 by-election

1873 by-election

1872 by-election

1868 by-election

1866 election

Notes

References 

Historical electorates of New Zealand
1865 establishments in New Zealand
1908 disestablishments in New Zealand
Politics of Otago
Waikouaiti